The uMfolozi Local Municipality council consists of thirty-five members elected by mixed-member proportional representation. Eighteen councillors are elected by first-past-the-post voting in eighteen wards, while the remaining seventeen are chosen from party lists so that the total number of party representatives is proportional to the number of votes received.

The municipality was enlarged at the time of the South African municipal election, 2016 when part of the disbanded Ntambanana Local Municipality was merged into it.

In the election of 3 August 2016 the African National Congress (ANC) won a narrow majority of seventeen seats on the council.

In the election of 1 November 2021 the Inkatha Freedom Party (IFP) won a majority of eighteen seats.

Results 
The following table shows the composition of the council after past elections.

December 2000 election

The following table shows the results of the 2000 election.

March 2006 election

The following table shows the results of the 2006 election.

May 2011 election

The following table shows the results of the 2011 election.

August 2016 election

The following table shows the results of the 2016 election.

November 2021 election

The following table shows the results of the 2021 election.

By-elections from November 2021
The following by-elections were held to fill vacant ward seats in the period from the election in November 2021.

References

uMfolozi
Elections in KwaZulu-Natal